Żerkowice may refer to the following places in Poland:
Żerkowice, Lower Silesian Voivodeship (south-west Poland)
Żerkowice, Lesser Poland Voivodeship (south Poland)
Żerkowice, Opole Voivodeship (south-west Poland)